Domingo Mora (1840–1911) was a Spanish-American sculptor and architectural sculptor.

Career
Born in Catalonia, Spain,  he studied sculpture in Barcelona and Madrid. He emigrated to Montevideo, Uruguay, where he married French-born Laura Gaillard. They had two sons, both of whom became artists – F. Luis Mora (1874–1940) and Jo Mora (1876–1947).  In 1877 the family moved to the United States, and Mora became chief designer for the Perth Amboy Terra Cotta Company. There, he designed architectural sculpture for hundreds of buildings, including New York City's Metropolitan Opera House. He later settled in California.

He was a member of the National Sculpture Society. Mora died in San Francisco, California, on July 24, 1911.

Selected works
Bas-relief panels on facade, Metropolitan Opera House, Broadway & 39th Street, New York City, J. Cleaveland Cady, architect (1882–83, demolished 1967).
Reredos, All Saints Ashmont Episcopal Church, 209 Ashmont Street, Dorchester, Massachusetts, Ralph Adams Cram, architect (1892–93).
Rotch reredos, Emmanuel Episcopal Church, Boston, designed by Francis R. Allen, architect, 1904.
Pedimental sculptures, New York Criminal Courts Building, Center & White Streets, New York City, Thom & Wilson, architects (1892–94, demolished ca.1939).
16 lifesize allegorical figures, Great Hall, Suffolk County Courthouse (now John Adams Courthouse), Pemberton Square, Boston, Massachusetts, George Albert Clough, architect (1893–94).
Architectural ornament, Tremont Temple, 88 Tremont Street, Boston, Massachusetts, Clarence Blackall, architect (1895–96).
Architectural ornament, capitals and friezes on the George Walter Vincent Smith Art Museum, Springfield, Massachusetts (1895).
Bas-relief panels on facade, Congregational House (now Congregational Library & Archives), 14 Beacon Street, Boston, Massachusetts, Shepley, Rutan and Coolidge, architects (1898).
Ceiling frieze of Music Room, J. P. Morgan Library, 225 Madison Avenue, New York City, McKim, Mead & White, architects (1907).
Architectural sculpture, Newhall Building, 260 California Street, San Francisco, California, Lewis P. Hobart, architect (1908–10).
Bas-relief panels on façade, Orpheum Theatre (now Palace Theatre), 620 S. Broadway, Los Angeles, California, G. Albert Lansburgh, architect (1911).

References

Sources

Oswald Spier, "Domingo Mora—A Sculptor in Clay," The Brickbuilder, An Architectural Monthly (Boston: Rogers & Manson, February 1912), pp. 28–32.

1840 births
1911 deaths
American architectural sculptors
20th-century American sculptors
20th-century American male artists
19th-century American sculptors
American male sculptors
19th-century American male artists